Robert Dione (also known as R. L. Dione) (February 23, 1922 in Portland, Maine – December 12, 1996 in Clinton, Connecticut) was a school teacher in Connecticut and an author on two books on UFOs and ancient astronauts.

Life and career

During World War II he was a paratrooper in the European Theatre. He obtained a B.S degree from the University of Maine and an M.A. Degree from Columbia Teachers College. He traveled widely, and authored two books on ancient astronauts, God Drives a Flying Saucer and a later book Is God Super-Natural? - The 4000 Year Misunderstanding. He was married and fathered five children.

God Drives a Flying Saucer

Dione wrote God Drives a Flying Saucer in 1969. The book is known for its eccentric claims:

God is not supernatural but is a technologically advanced Ufonaut (Saucerian God)
The angel Gabriel hypnotized Mary and injected her with a hypodermic needle with God's sperm in it
Jesus was born by artificial insemination
Extraterrestrial visitation from aliens is common in both the Old and New Testament
Ezekiels visions were hallucinations caused by UFOS
UFOS are God's messengers
God is immortal through technology
Heaven is a supertechnological society
All miracles are to be explained by flying saucer technology
The human brain is akin to a radio: it can receive and emit electromagnetic signals
The star over Bethlehem was a luminous flying saucer

Dione believed that aliens could track a particular person on earth and beam in thoughts to control them by using "God's radio frequency". Dione claimed that the God was upset with Russia because of its atheism, so God manipulated Hitler by sending Hitler electromagnetic brain signals to overthrow the Russian Empire. Dione also claimed in the book that Jesus did not perform any miracles in the Bible, the miracles were actually due to mind manipulation caused by alien technology. According to Dione, “By the use of hypnotism He (Saucerian God) created the twisted, blind and insane subjects Jesus was to cure at a later date.”

See also

Morris Jessup
Paul Misraki

References

1922 births
1996 deaths
People from South Portland, Maine
Pseudohistorians
Ancient astronauts proponents
American UFO writers
United States Army personnel of World War II
University of Maine alumni
Teachers College, Columbia University alumni
United States Army soldiers